Oier Aizpurua Aranzadi (born 6 November 1977 in Zumaia) is a Spanish sprint canoer who competed in the early 2000s. He won three medals at the ICF Canoe Sprint World Championships with a silver (K-4 200 m: 2002) and two bronzes (K-4 200 m: 2003, K-4 500 m: 2002).

Notes

References 

 
 
 

1977 births
Living people
Spanish male canoeists
ICF Canoe Sprint World Championships medalists in kayak
Sportspeople from Gipuzkoa
Canoeists from the Basque Country (autonomous community)
People from Urola Kosta
21st-century Spanish people